Inner West Magpies (formerly Western Suburbs AFC) is an Australian rules football club competing in the AFL Sydney league. The club is based in the inner west of Sydney, New South Wales, and its senior teams play their home games at their home ground of Picken Oval; having previously played out of Henson Park in 2009 and 2010. The Western Wolves AFC women's team fully integrated with the men's team before the 2019 AFL Sydney season; in conjunction with this integration the club changed its name in order to better represent its region and community.

History
The Magpies were formed in 1926 and re-formed in 1947. The club, which became the first licensed Australian rules football club in New South Wales in 1962, is located in Croydon Park, next to Picken Oval. During the 1960s and 1970s, Western Suburbs was by far the most successful club in the competition. They made every grand final from 1963 to 1969 and every grand final from 1971 to 1979 bar one.

In 2005, in the premier division Western Suburbs only lost one of the 16 minor round games and secured the minor premiership. However, they lost the grand final to old rivals North Shore. In 2009 and 2010, the club under the coaching tutelage of Craig Tognolini, made the preliminary final.

Many fine players have been recruited from the Magpies to the AFL including Paul Bevan (Sydney), Arthur Chilcott (Sydney), Terry Ingersoll (Hawthorn) and Greg Stafford (Sydney/Richmond) amongst others. Paul Bevan was a Sydney Swans premiership player in 2005. John Northey coached at the club before coaching at AFL Level.

Premierships
Senior men's premierships have been won in 1951, 1963, 1965, 1966, 1969, 1972, 1974, 1975, 1977 and 1996.

References

External links
 
 Full Points Footy Profile for Western Suburbs Magpies

Australian rules football clubs in Sydney
1926 establishments in Australia
Australian rules football clubs established in 1926